Ashiyan (also Romanized as Āshīyān and Āshīān; also known as Īshīān) is a village in Otaqvar Rural District, Otaqvar District, Langarud County, Gilan Province, Iran. At the 2006 census, its population was 238, in 62 families.

References 

Populated places in Langarud County